The economy of Georgia is an emerging free market economy. Its gross domestic product fell sharply following the dissolution of the Soviet Union but recovered in the mid-2000s, growing in double digits thanks to the economic and democratic reforms brought by the peaceful Rose Revolution. Georgia continued its economic progress since, "moving from a near-failed state in 2003 to a relatively well-functioning market economy in 2014". In 2007, the World Bank named Georgia the World's number one economic reformer, and has consistently ranked the country at the top of its ease of doing business index.

Georgia's economy is supported by a relatively free and transparent atmosphere in the country. According to Transparency International's 2018 report, Georgia is the least corrupt nation in the Black Sea region, outperforming all of its immediate neighbors, as well as nearby European Union states. With a mixed news media environment, Georgia is also the only country in its immediate neighborhood where the press is not deemed unfree.

Since 2014, Georgia is part of the European Union's Free Trade Area, with the EU continuing to be the country's largest trading partner, accounting for over a quarter of Georgia's total trade turnover. Following the EU trade pact, 2015 was marked by further increase in bilateral trade, whereas trade with the Commonwealth of Independent States (CIS) decreased precipitously.

History 
Before the 20th century Georgia had a largely agrarian economy.

Georgia's modern economy has traditionally revolved around Black Sea tourism, cultivation of citrus fruits, tea and grapes; mining of manganese and copper; and the output of a large industrial sector producing wine, metals, machinery, chemicals, and textiles.

Like many post-Soviet countries, Georgia went through a period of sharp economic decline during the 1990s, with high inflation and large budget-deficits, due to persistent tax evasion. In 1996 Georgia's budget deficit rose to as much as 6.2%. During that period international financial institutions played a critical role in Georgia's budgetary calculations. Multilateral and bilateral grants and loans totaled 116.4 million lari in 1997; they totaled 182.8 million lari in 1998.

Economic recovery had been hampered by the separatist disputes in Abkhazia and South Ossetia, resistance to reform on the part of some corrupt and reactionary factions, and the Asian financial crisis of 1997. Under the leadership of President Shevardnadze (in office 1995–2003), the government nonetheless made some progress on basic market reforms: it liberalized all prices and most trade, introduced a stable national currency (the lari), and massively downsized government.

During the late 1990s more than 10,500 small enterprises had been privatized, and although privatization of medium- and large-sized firms had been slow, more than 1,200 medium – and large-sized companies had been set up as joint stock companies. A law and a decree establishing the legal basis and procedures for state property privatization reduced the number of companies controlled by the state.

The United States began assisting Georgia in the process of reform soon after the country gained independence from the Soviet Union. Gradually, the focus shifted from humanitarian to technical and institution-building programs. Provision of legal and technical advisors was complemented by training opportunities for parliamentarians, law enforcement officials, and economic advisers.

Recent macroeconomic performance
Over the last few years Georgian economy has been one of the fastest in the FSU. Since 2003's Rose Revolution, the new Government of Georgia implemented broad and comprehensive reforms, that touched every aspect of the country's life. Economic reforms were addressed to liberalization of the economy and provision of sustainable economic growth, based on the private sector development. Establishment of an attractive business environment led to significant inflow of Foreign Direct Investment in the country, facilitating high economic growth rates.

In 2013, Georgia ranked in the top ten countries in the Emerging Market Energy Security Growth Prosperity Index, according to an article published by CISTRAN Finance news. The index identifies emerging nations that have strong growth potential based on energy reserves and GDP.

Following reforms, Georgia's economy successfully diversified and began showing rapid upward growth, averaging over 10% annual real GDP growth from 2004–2007, peaking at 12.3 percent in 2007. Overall, from 2004-2007, the economy of Georgia expanded by 35%.

Georgia's economic liberalization policy demonstrated some resilience to external shocks – war with Russia in 2008 and the global financial crisis. Despite this, in 2008 Georgia economy grew by 2.3%. After contracting in 2009 (−3.8%), the economy recovered soon after, growing 6.3% in 2010 and 7.0% in 2011. The unemployment rate shrunk from 16.9% to 16.3% between 2009 and 2010.

In 2013 the annual inflation rate in Georgia equaled 2.4%. It has been decreased significantly after 11.2% in 2010. Growth of inflation rate was the result of increasing food prices in the world and essential share of the inflation fluctuations came on variability of food prices, as far as the share of food is relatively high in consumer basket of Georgia.

In 2011, IMF estimated current account balance of Georgia was −1.489 BN USD. Georgia has moderate deficits among the European and Transcaucasian Post-Soviet states. The trade with Georgia's major partners continued growing. As an example, in 2016, Georgia exported $87,263.53 worth of products to Armenia, and imported $144,931.92 worth of products from Armenia. Deficits in current account have been more than offset by strong foreign capital inflows, allowing the Georgian currency to appreciate.

The government has managed to preserve financial stability thanks to the considerable aid provided by the US and international institutions. EBRD analysts believe that substantial international financial support and remittances from workers living abroad will cover the current account deficit in the medium term. IMF positively evaluated government's economic policy.

Foreign direct investment in Georgia 

Large inflows of Foreign direct investment (FDI) have been a driving factor behind a rapid economic growth in Georgia since 2003.

An attractive and liberal investment environment and equal approach to local and foreign investors makes the country an attractive destination for FDI.

Stable economic development, liberal and free market oriented economic policy, 6 taxes only and reduced tax rates, reduced number of licenses and permissions, dramatically simplified administrative procedures, preferential trade regimes with foreign countries, advantageous geographic location, well developed, integrated and multimodal transport infrastructure,  educated, skilled and competitive workforce presents a solid ground for successful business in Georgia. In addition to other advantages, Georgia has Free Industrial Zones, where companies are exempt from all the corporate taxes.

From 2003 to 2011, FDI in Georgia amounted to US$8511.5 million. The highest volume of FDI – 2,015.0 million USD was reached in 2007, with 69.3% yearly growth. High rate of investment was maintained until 2008. In 2007, the EC27 accounted for over 56% of FDI inflows and in 2008 the EC, UAE, and Turkey accounted for nearly 60%. In 2009, FDI inflows were characterized by decreasing trend. The main reasons of decreasing were external shocks – Russian-Georgian war and the influences of global financial crisis.

In the first half of 2017, Armenian Investments to Georgia nearly doubled year-on-year to $5.6 million, while investments from Azerbaijan dropped by 20.3% year-on-year to the overall $224.18 million.

• In 2009–2011 the largest share of FDI felt on Industry sector (31.2) amounted to US$765 million, real estate sector (15.8%) amounting to US$389 million.

The table below shows FDI stock as a percentage of GDP in selected FSU countries. For statistical purposes, FDI is defined as a foreign company owning 10% or more of the ordinary shares of an incorporated firm or its equivalent for an unincorporated firm.

Foreign direct investment in the country of Georgia by year.

Trade

Since 2014, Georgia is part of the European Union's Free Trade Area, with the EU continuing to be the country's largest trading partner, accounting for over a quarter of Georgia's total trade turnover. Following the EU trade pact, 2015 was marked by further increase in bilateral trade, whereas trade with the Russian-led Commonwealth of Independent States (CIS) decreased by 22%.

As of 2015, in the order of magnitude, Georgia's main exports were: copper ores and concentrates, ferroalloys, hazelnut, medications, nitrogen fertilizers, wine, crude oil, mineral water, non-denatured ethanol and spirits.

In 2015, Georgia's main imports, in the order of magnitude, were: oil products, vehicles, hydrocarbons, copper ores and concentrates,  mobile phones and other wireless phones, wheat, cigarettes, iron tubes and pipes, structures and parts of structures of iron.

In 2019, Georgian exports to Armenia grew by 2% compared to previous year, while imports decreased by 7%. Georgia exported 98.3 million $ worth of products to Armenia (4% of total exports), and imported 46.9 million $ (1% of total imports) in 2019.

International money transfers 
Money transferred from abroad to Georgia in 2019 amounted to USD 1.73 billion, according to figures released by Georgia's central bank. Money transfers from Russia, which has been the largest source of remittances for Georgia for many years already, stood at USD 428.89 million in 2019.

Among other largest sources of remittances for Georgia are: Greece with USD 192.56 million in 2019, Italy – USD 239.17 million; the United States  – USD 178.41 million; Ukraine – USD 47.3 million; Spain – USD 30.9 million; Turkey – USD 94.85 million; Kazakhstan – USD 26.63 million; the UK – USD 16.89 million; Israel – USD 162.55 million; Azerbaijan – USD 22.17 million; Germany – USD 49.81 million; France – USD 26.37 million; Canada – USD 14.21 million.

Institutional reforms

Under the Saakashvili administration, Georgia undertook a number of profound institutional reforms aimed at modernizing the economy and improving business climate. Kakha Bendukidze (1956–2014) was one of the most notable team members during his governance, coordinating the Ministry of Economical Reforms of Georgia. Implemented institutional reforms created an effective, professional and transparent public sector, motivated to protect the principles of democracy. Due to the economic deregulation policy, number of state regulated spheres sharply decreased, as well as regulation procedures were simplified.

Georgia succeeded in fighting against corruption, that was the one of the main obstacles for development. Success of Georgia is recognized by different rating agencies. According to the Transparency International, Georgia is the top country in the post-Soviet region in terms of fighting corruption. According to the Corruption Perception Index published by Transparency International, Georgia ranked 50th in 2014 (up from 113rd in 2004). "Global Corruption Barometer 2010" ranks Georgia the first among world countries in the term of decrease corruption level. According to International Finance Corporation Business Perception Survey 2012 only 0.11% of surveyed (1 respondent out of 920) named corruption as a problem in relations with public organizations.

Georgia has the most liberal tax jurisdiction in Europe. The number of taxes is decreased from 21 to only 6, tax rates were reduced also. In addition, significant procedural and institutional reforms was implemented – simplified system of tax disputes was established, tax administration system was streamlined and most of taxes currently are paid on-line.

Due to the customs reform customs procedures were dramatically simplified. Customs tariffs reform significantly simplified and sharply reduced the costs connected to the foreign trade. Number of import tariffs was abolished on approximately 90% of products and only 3 tariff rates exist instead of previous 16. Currently 86% of tariff lines are duty-free compared to 26% in 2005. Modern Customs Clearance Zones were established and customs clearness procedures could be made starting from 15 minutes only.

Modernization of system of licenses and permits resulted in decrease of number of licenses and permits and simplification of related administrative procedures.

Privatization of state property – Starting from 2004, provision of transparent privatization policy was one of the important reforms of the Government of Georgia, that was addressed to denationalization of the remained state property in order to attract foreign investments, increase and develop the private sector and effective use of country's resources.

Liberal labour legislation simplified the relations between employers and employees. As a result of the reform, ”Heritage Foundation” and other analytical centers named Georgian Labour Code as one of the most liberal in the world, because it significantly reduced hiring and firing expenses.

Georgia offers the most simplified procedures for registration of business, property, for getting different documentations via “One-Stop-Shops”, where the most procedures could be done on-line. Doing Business 2012 report (WB) places Georgia 16th in terms of Ease of Doing Business index (up from 112 in 2006), naming Georgia as the top reformer amongst the 174 countries over the last 5 years. Georgia is amongst the leaders in other ratings, namely, registering property – first place; Dealing Construction Permits – 4th place, Starting a Business – 7th place; Getting Credits – 8th place.

Licensing regulation

Due to the reform of the system of licenses and permits, the number licenses and permits was reduced by 90%. Currently, licenses and permits are only used in the production of highly risky goods and services; also usage of natural resources and specific activities. The procedures of issuing licenses and permits were significantly simplified, the “One-Stop Shop” and “Silence is Consent” principles were introduced which implies that if person is not notified with argumentation rejection about issuance of license in limited framework, the license is considered as issued from the relevant body.

The procedures for getting a construction permits was dramatically simplified and it requires just 3 procedures. The time for getting the construction permits was sharply reduced. According to Doing Business 2012 (WB) Georgia is the best performer in the Eastern Europe and Central Asia (ECA) region and places on 4-th position in the world. The number of procedures and days, the cost (% of income per capita) is much more lower, than in ECA region and OECD countries.

Things have changed after new Law on Issuance of Licenses and Permits was introduced in 2005. The approval process for building a warehouse in Georgia is now more efficient than in all EU countries except Denmark.

Tax collection

Since January, 2011 the new Tax Code came into force. It unifies the old Tax and Customs Codes. The new Tax Code increased confidence towards the Georgian tax system and enhanced trust in the Georgian tax authorities, by improving communication between taxpayers and the tax authorities, by protecting the taxpayers’ rights, by making administration more efficient, and by harmonizing the Georgian laws with the best international tax practices and EU directives.

Only 6 taxes exist in Georgia with law tax rates: Income Tax (personal income tax) 20%; Profit Tax (corporate tax) – 15%; Value Added Tax – 18%; Excise – varies; Property Tax up to 1% of the self-assessed value of property; Customs Tax – 0%; 5%; 12%. In addition, significant procedural and institutional reforms were performed, simplified tax dispute settlement, streamlined tax administration decreased the time and cost of paying taxes. Georgia made paying taxes easier for firms by simplifying the reporting for value added tax and introducing electronic filling and payment of taxes.

Number of import tariffs was abolished on approximately 90% of products and only 3 tariff rates (0%, 5%, 12%) exist instead of previous 16. Georgia sets Import Taxes on only several kinds of agricultural and manufactured goods . In addition, there are no quantitative restrictions (quotas) on imports and exports.

Labour regulation

With unemployment around 16% and many jobs in the informal sector, Georgia undertook a far-reaching reform of labour regulation. The new Labour Code was adopted on 17 December 2010. The new law eases restrictions on the duration of term contracts and the number of overtime hours and discards the premium required for overtime work. It also eliminates the requirement to notify and get permission from the labour union to fire a redundant worker. The new law provides for 1 month's severance pay at least, replacing complex rules under which required notice periods depended on seniority and the manager had to write long explanations to labor unions and the relevant ministry. In general, new regulation makes Georgian labor market much more flexible.

Coupled with the fact that Georgia also reduced the social security contributions paid on wages by businesses from 31% to 20% in 2005, and abolished them entirely starting January 2008, these changes make Georgia the sixth easiest place to employ workers globally.

Judicial procedure 

Reducing corruption in courts was one of the chief priorities of the new government. Since 2004, when the Saakashvili administration came in, seven judges have been detained for taking bribes and 15 brought before the criminal courts. In 2005 alone the judicial disciplinary council reviewed cases against 99 judges, about 40% of the judiciary, and 12 judges were dismissed. At the same time judges’ salaries were increased fourfold, to reduce dependence on bribe money.

According to Global Property Guide index, Georgia currently holds 40 points out of 100. That stands for "The court system is highly inefficient, and delays are so long that they deter the use of the court system. Corruption is present, and the judiciary is influenced by other branches of government. Expropriation is possible."
Some unsatisfied responses concerning the judiciary system may be found among Georgian websites, though  its genuineness is controversial.

Unemployment

Unemployment has been a persistent problem in Georgia ever since the country gained independence in 1991. According to National Statistics Office (Georgia) unemployment rate stood at 16.9% in 2013 and it has been decreased at 11.6% in 2019.

Nearly a half of Georgia's population lives in rural areas, where low-intensity self-sufficient farming provides the principal source of livelihood. Georgian statistics service puts individual persons into the category of self-employed workers. As of 2007 416,900 persons were listed as self-employed in agriculture. For large families, heads of households are typically described as  "individual entrepreneurs", members of the family that help to cultivate land are classified as "unpaid family business workers". The use of this methodology produces relatively low unemployment rates for rural areas rather in urban areas and in Tbilisi.
Neighbouring countries show somewhat similar results. For example, Armenia in 2015 had 18.26% unemployment rate, which is 532.644 people.

Structure of the economy

Energy 

In recent years Georgia has fully deregulated its electricity sector, and now there is free and open access to the market.

Georgia has a sizable hydroelectric capacity, a factor that has become an increasingly important component of its energy supplies and policies. The country's topography and abundance of hydro resources give it serious potential to dominate hydroelectric markets in the Caucasus region. The Georgian Ministry of Energy estimates that there are around 26,000 rivers within Georgian territory, with approximately 300 of those rivers being significant in terms of energy production. The Ministry also claims that current projects for hydroelectric power plants total around US$2.4 billion. Alexander Khetaguri, the former Georgian Minister of Energy, proposed new hydroelectric projects worth well over 22,000 megawatts of capacity, which would cost over US$40 billion and would be privately funded. These projects alone would transform Georgia into the world's second-largest hydropower producer.

In 2007, Georgia generated 8.34 billion kilowatt-hours of electricity while consuming 8.15 billion kWh. Most of Georgia's electricity generation comes from hydroelectric facilities. In 2005, the country generated 6.17 billion kWh of hydropower, or 86% of total electricity generation. In 2006 rapid growth in hydroelectricity output (by 27%) was matched by equally strong growth in thermal electricity (by 28%). Since then the share of hydropower has grown even bigger, when Inguri power plant reached full capacity in November 2007. In addition to state-owned Inguri, which has an installed capacity of 1,300 megawatts, Georgia's hydroelectric infrastructure consists of many small private plants.

In recent years, Georgia became a major exporter of electricity in the region, exporting 1.3 billion KWh in 2010. Hydropower stations of Georgia produce 80-85% of the electricity utilized within the country, the remaining 15-20% is produced by thermal power stations. According to Ministry of Energy and Natural Resources, so far Georgia has been exploiting only 18% of its hydro resource potential.

Georgia's reliance on hydropower leaves the country vulnerable to climatic fluctuations, which requires imports to meet seasonal shortages, but also opens the possibility of exports during wetter conditions. Georgia still has the potential to increase hydro-generated power, through refurbishing existing facilities, as well as constructing new hydropower plants.

One of the more difficult realities facing many of the former Soviet republics was the loss of Soviet-subsidized fuel and utility transfers. Prior to 2004, Georgia's transmission network was in critical condition, with electricity blackouts being common throughout the country. In response to mounting pressures, the Georgian government initiated a series of legislative reforms in 1998 and 1999 to begin to develop the power sector and electricity markets. While measures were taken to unbundle and liberalize the energy sector, a new law was drafted and Georgia's independent regulatory authority, the Georgian National Energy Regulatory Commission (GNERC), was formed. In addition to providing government subsidies, the GNERC was able to increase the prices of electricity and natural gas in Georgia to buffer the costs of recovery from the state's reform process. Following these reforms, distribution has been increasingly more reliable, approaching consistent 24-hour-a-day services. Investments in infrastructure have been made as well.
Currently, a privately owned Energo-Pro Georgia controls 62.5% of the electricity distribution market.

Georgia has transmission lines that connect its power grid to Russia, Turkey, Armenia and Azerbaijan. In July 2008 Georgia began exporting electricity to Russia through the Kavkasioni power line. Later in 2009, Georgian Energy Minister Alexander Khetaguri incited scandal for a business deal struck with the Russian energy company, Inter RAO, to jointly manage the Georgian Inguri hydropower plant for 10 years. Khetaguri's proposal would entail a cash flow of around US$9 million into Georgia for use of the plant. Tensions ran high, however, as the Inguri hydropower plant provides nearly 40 to 50 percent of the country's electricity and is located at the administrative border of the secessionist Abkhazia region.

Georgian Natural gas consumption stood at 1.8 billion cubic meters in 2007. Natural gas used to be supplied to Georgia by Russia. In recent years, however, Georgia has been able to eliminate its dependency on imports from Russia, thanks to increased hydroelectricity production, and the availability of natural gas sources from Azerbaijan. In addition, all Russian gas exports to Armenia pass through the Georgian pipeline system. Georgia takes 10% of that gas as a transit fee.

Georgia is a partner country of the EU INOGATE energy programme, which has four key topics: enhancing energy security,
convergence of member state energy markets on the basis of EU internal energy market principles,
supporting sustainable energy development, and attracting investment for energy projects of common and regional interest.

Agriculture 

Currently, about 55% of the total labor force is employed in agriculture, though much of this is subsistence farming.

Georgian agricultural production is beginning to recover following the devastation caused by the civil unrest and the necessary restructuring following the breakup of the Soviet Union. Livestock production is beginning to rebound, although it continues to be confronted by minor and sporadic disease outbreaks. Domestic grain production is increasing, and government invests in improvement of  infrastructure improvements to ensure appropriate distribution and revenues to farmers. Tea, hazelnut and citrus production have suffered greatly as a result of the conflict in Abkhazia, a crucial area for planting the latter crops.

Approximately 7% of the Georgian GDP (2011) is generated by the agrarian sector.

Viticulture and winemaking are the most important fields of Georgia's agriculture. Over 450 species of local vine are bred in Georgia, and the country is considered as one of the oldest places of producing top-quality wines in the world. Russia was traditionally the biggest export market for Georgian wine. This, however, changed in 2006, when Russia banned imports of wine and mineral water from Georgia, preceded by statements of Georgian governmental officials about low quality requirements of the Russian market. Since then Georgian wine producers have struggled to maintain output and break into new markets.

In 2011 Georgia sold wine in total amount of 54 mln USD in 48 countries and alcoholic beverages in total amount of 68 mln USD in 32 countries.  Vines and  alcoholic beverages are in the top 10 export commodity's list with 2,5% and 3.1% share respectively.
According to National Wine Agency of Georgia export of Georgian wine is increasing. 2011 wine export is 109% higher than 2007 exports. According to 2012 information, Georgia trades wine with 43 countries, selling over 23 million bottles. Biggest export partners for Georgia in wine industry are Ukraine (47.3% of wine export), Kazakhstan (18.9%) and Belarus (6.9%).
In 2011 export of vines, mineral waters and alcoholic beverages exceeded export of all years after 2006. 
Georgia is rich with spring waters and production of mineral waters is one of the main spheres of industry. Export of mineral waters in 2011 amounted to 48 mln USD in 35 countries. Share of mineral water in total export is 2.1%.
Food processing industry is developing align with the primary agricultural production and export of processed products is increasing year by year. Export of nuts constituted about 6% of Georgian export (2011) and is among 10 top export commodity list with total amount of 130 mln USD. Nuts was exported in 53 countries.

Rural population as a percentage of total population in Georgia was 48.2% in 2011 and decreased to 46.3%  in 2014.

Georgia produced in 2018:

 259 thousand tons of grape;
 237 thousand tons of potato;
 194 thousand tons of maize;
 107 thousand tons of wheat;
 82 thousand tons of apple;
 62 thousand tons of tangerine;
 57 thousand tons of barley;
 57 thousand tons of watermelon;
 51 thousand tons of tomato;
 33 thousand tons of cucumber;
 27 thousand tons of peach;

In addition to smaller productions of other agricultural products.

Tourism 

Tourism in Georgia (country) is one of the fastest growing sectors of the local economy, which has high potential for further development. During recent years the number of visitors to Georgia increased significantly contributing to the growth of other tourism related sectors. In 2011, more, about 3 million visitors visited Georgia 40 percent more, than in 2010. To foster the development of the tourism sector the Government of Georgia invests heavily in the development of the transportation and basic infrastructure, renovation and development of tourism destinations, which is a stimulus for the private investment generation. In 2011, total output of tourism related services production increased by 77% compared to 2006 and constituted 7.1% of total output of economy. In 2018 tourism generated 3.4 billion dollars in tax revenue for Georgia.

The following table shows the monthly average for incoming tourists in Georgia by citizenship and number of visits (in thousands).

According to data from Georgia's National Tourism Administration, TASS reported that Armenia is third on the list of countries with the most visits from citizens in 2021. Turkey leads the pack in terms of trips made by visitors to Georgia last year, with 326 thousand, 2.7% fewer than in the previous year. With more than 212 thousand tourist visitors, 2.1% more than in 2020, Russia comes in second. Georgia received over 1.8 million international visits in total in 2021, an increase of 7.7% from the previous year.

Logistics 

Georgia is one of the key members in international TRACECA programme due to its important geographical and political location. Since it is situated right in between of Europe and Asia, the country is supposed to become a busy transitional hub of a modern Silk Road in the near future. On  March 11 of 2015, Georgian media declared that the Chinese and Georgian companies have reached an agreement in Beijing concerning the developing of the deep-water port at Anaklia, which existence is crucial for the TRACECA route. The port will be constructed on a plot of over 1,000 hectares and have access to a deep sea canyon. US-Based SSA Marine was later finally chosen to Invest in and Operate Container Terminal of Anaklia Deep Sea Port in Georgia by signing an agreement with Anaklia Development Consortium on 1 August 2017.

First train containing 82 containers and 41 platforms came from China to Baku, Azerbaijan on July 28. It is planned to launch a first carriage using this way through Georgia to Istanbul in September 2015. Baku–Tbilisi–Kars railway became operational on October 30, 2017.

Re-exportation of vehicles which is one of the income sources for Georgia has lowered much during 2014–2015 stagnation, most noticeably to Azerbaijan: it became 5.1 times less (on 10 337 cars) comparing to the previous year.

Finance 

Like most other post-soviet countries, Georgia's finance sector is dominated by banks. As of 2015, there were 21 commercial banks, of which 5 large banks controlled most of financial assets. There are some major challenges facing the banking sector. For instance, banks play a limited role in financing the real economy and in investing in activities that are required to stabilize the country's persistent trade.

Human Development Index of Georgia 
Human Development Index is a composite statistic of life expectancy, education, and income indices used to rank countries into four tiers of human development.
Georgia's HDI value for 2017 is 0.780— in the high human development category—positioning it at 70 out of 189 countries and territories. The rank is shared with Antigua and Barbuda. Between 2000 and 2017, Georgia's HDI value increased from 0.673 to 0.780, an increase of 15.9 percent or average annual increase of about 0.9 percent. Between 1990 and 2017, Georgia's life expectancy at birth increased by 3.1 years, mean years of schooling increased by 1.1 years and expected years of schooling increased by 2.6 years, also Georgia's GNI per capita increased by about 21.0%. However, it is misleading to compare values and rankings with those of previously published reports, because the underlying data and methods have changed over time.

See also 
 List of Georgian companies
 List of countries by received FDI
 Kulevi Oil Terminal

Further reading
 Gugushvili, Alexi: "Understanding Poverty in Georgia" in the Caucasus Analytical Digerst No.34

Notes

References 

 Government press release on unemployment in 2007
 How to register company in Georgia?

External links 
 Official site of American Chamber of Commerce in Georgia
 Sakartvelos Ekonomika , an online monthly on Georgia's economy.
 online English language business magazine in Georgia

 
Georgia
Georgia